Evarcha improcera is a species of jumping spider in the genus Evarcha that lives in the Yemen. The female was first described in 2007.

References

Salticidae
Spiders of Asia
Spiders described in 2007
Taxa named by Wanda Wesołowska